Ban Thung Pho Junction railway station is a railway station located in Phunphin Subdistrict, Phunphin District, Surat Thani. Ban Thung Pho Junction is a class 2 railway station, located 631.0 km from Thon Buri railway station. Ban Thung Pho Junction acts as the railway junction between the Southern Line mainline and the Khiri Rat Nikhom Branch. This is also the location of a container yard for freight trains.

The station opened in July 1916, as part of the Chumphon–Ban Na section. The section to Khiri Rat Nikhom opened in April 1956.

Train services 
 Local 445/446 Chumphon–Hat Yai Junction–Chumphon
 Local 489/490 Surat Thani–Khiri Rat Nikhom–Surat Thani

References 
  
  

Buildings and structures in Surat Thani province
Railway stations in Thailand
Railway stations opened in 1916